This is a summary of 1903 in music in the United Kingdom.

Events
12 February - Cyril Scott performs in his own Quartet for Piano and Strings at a Broadwood Concert in St James's Hall, London; the other three parts are played by Fritz Kreisler, Emil Kreuz and Ludwig Lebell.
June – Elgar's Dream of Gerontius is given its London premiere at Westminster Cathedral. Arthur Johnstone's favourable reviews of the work in The Guardian are generally credited with increasing its popularity. 
date unknown
Edward Elgar buys Royal Sunbeam bicycles for himself and his wife; he names his bicycle "Mr Phoebus".
Arthur Wood becomes musical director of Terry's Theatre in London and is the city's youngest musical director at 28.
Alexander Mackenzie makes a tour of Canada, organised by Charles A.E. Harriss.
Cecil Sharp begins collecting folk songs.

Publications
Henry Saxe Wyndham – Arthur Seymour Sullivan, 1842-1900

Popular music
"Little Yellow Bird", with words by William Hargreaves and music by Clarence Wainwright Murphy
"Spring, Sweet Spring", with words by Stanislaus Strange and music by Julian Edwards

Classical music: new works
Edward Elgar – The Apostles (oratorio)
Joseph Parry – "Dear Wife"

Opera
Edward German – A Princess of Kensington, with libretto by Basil Hood

Musical theatre
9 May – The School Girl, with book by Henry Hamilton and Paul M. Potter, music by Leslie Stuart and Paul Rubens, and lyrics by Charles H. Taylor, opens at the Prince of Wales Theatre, where it runs for 333 performances.
21 December – The Cherry Girl, with a book by Seymour Hicks, lyrics by Aubrey Hopwood and music by Ivan Caryll, opens at the Vaudeville Theatre; it runs until August 1904, when it goes on tour.

Births
18 January – Gladys Hooper, née Nash, pianist (died 2016)
22 January – Robin Milford, composer and educator (d. 1959)
8 March – Avril Coleridge-Taylor, pianist, conductor and composer (died 1998)
12 May – Lennox Berkeley, composer (d. 1989)
26 June – Margaret More, composer (died 1966)
2 September – Fred Pratt Green, Methodist minister and hymn writer (died 2000)
29 October – Vivian Ellis, composer and lyricist (died 1996)
31 October – Eric Ball, composer, arranger and conductor of brass band music (died 1989)
17 December – Ray Noble, bandleader, composer and arranger (d. 1978)
date unknown – Leo Maguire, singer, songwriter and radio broadcaster (died 1985)

Deaths
17 February – Joseph Parry, organist and composer, 61
June – Constance Bache, pianist, composer and music teacher, 57
26 October – Herbert Oakeley, composer, 73

See also
 1903 in the United Kingdom

References

British Music, 1903 in
Music
British music by year
1900s in British music